The Daytime Protocol is a service in the Internet Protocol Suite, defined in 1983 in RFC 867. It is intended for testing and measurement purposes in computer networks.

A host may connect to a server that supports the Daytime Protocol on either Transmission Control Protocol (TCP) or User Datagram Protocol (UDP) port 13. The server returns an ASCII character string of the current date and time in an unspecified format.

Inetd implementation
On  UNIX-like operating systems a daytime server is usually built into the inetd (or xinetd) daemon. The service is usually not enabled by default. It may be enabled by adding the following lines to the file  and telling inetd to reload its configuration:
 daytime   stream  tcp     nowait  root    internal
 daytime   dgram   udp     wait    root    internal

An example output may be:
 Thursday, February 2, 2006 13:45:51-PST

See also
 List of well-known ports
 Echo Protocol
 QOTD
 Time Protocol
 Network Time Protocol

External links
 RFC 867
 List of NIST time servers supporting this protocol

Network time-related software
Application layer protocols